Zymosan is a glucan with repeating glucose units connected by β-1,3-glycosidic linkages. It binds to TLR 2 and Dectin-1 (CLEC7A). Zymosan is a ligand found on the surface of fungi, like yeast.  

Zymosan is prepared from yeast cell wall and consists of protein-carbohydrate complexes. It is used to induce experimental sterile inflammation. In macrophages, zymosan-induced responses include the induction of proinflammatory cytokines, arachidonate mobilization, protein phosphorylation, and inositol phosphate formation. Zymosan A also raises cyclin D2 levels suggesting a role for the latter in macrophage activation besides proliferation. It potentiates acute liver damage after galactosamine injection suggesting that certain types of nonparenchymal cells other than Kupffer cells are involved in zymosan action.

References

External links
 

Polysaccharides